Michel Gafour  (born 25 March 1982) is a French professional football midfielder who last played for SC Toulon-Le Las in the French amateur leagues. He had a spell with Liberia Mia in the Primera Division de Costa Rica.

Career
Born in Toulon, Gafour made five Ligue 1 appearances for Olympique Marseille before joining AS Cannes. Cannes released him after one season, and he trained with Cambridge United F.C. in 2004.

Gafour played for the French youth national team in 2000.

References

External links
 Profile at Nacion 
 

1982 births
Living people
French footballers
Olympique de Marseille players
AS Cannes players
SC Toulon players
French expatriate footballers
Expatriate footballers in Costa Rica
Sportspeople from Toulon
SO Cassis Carnoux players
Athlético Marseille players
SC Toulon-Le Las players
Association football midfielders
Footballers from Provence-Alpes-Côte d'Azur